Kaberamaido is a town in Eastern Uganda. It is the main municipal, administrative and commercial center of Kaberamaido District and is the location of the headquarters for the district.

Location
The coordinates of the town are: Latitude: 1.766667 (1° 46' 00.0"N); Longitude: 33.152221 (33° 09' 08.0"E).

Population
In 2002, the national population census estimated the town's population at about 2,350. In 2010, the Uganda Bureau of Statistics (UBOS), estimated the population of the town at about 3,200. In 2011, UBOS estimated the mid-year population of Kaberamaido at 3,400.

Points of interest
The following points of interest lie within the town limits or near the edges of town:
 The headquarters of Kaberamaido District Administration
 The offices of Kaberamaido Town Council
 Kaberamaido Central Market.

See also

References

External links
Location of Kaberamaido Town At Google Maps

Kaberamaido District
Teso sub-region
Populated places in Eastern Region, Uganda
Cities in the Great Rift Valley